Choudwar is a town and a municipality in Cuttack district in the Indian state of Odisha. It comes under Bhubaneswar-Cuttack commissionerate.

Geography
Choudwar is located on the banks of Mahanadi and Birupa river near 16 and 55 National Highway. It is adjoining Cuttack, a city in Odisha. The STD code for Choudwar is 0671 with 754025, 754071, 754072, and 754028 postal codes. Choudwar comes under the Bhubaneswar–Cuttack Police Commissionerate which is an upcoming twin-city  as per the plan of the Government of Odisha Vision 2030.

History
Choudwar was thought to be an important center during Somavanshi Keshari kingdom of Odisha. The Keshari dynasty established eight prominent Shakti Peetha shrines near Chodova, which are now in ruins.

In mythology, it was the capital of Virat, the brother-in-law of Kichaka. The Pandava brothers took refuge in Choudwar during their exile. The name Choudwar is made of two words: Chou implying Four and Dwar which means gate. The name alludes to existence of an old fort, which had four gates. Baidheshwar temple near Agrahat village has an aquatic spring believed to had been dug with the archery of Arjun. Archaeological Survey of India found many artefacts around these location pointing to ancient settlements. Ten acres of the land has been fenced by the Archaeological survey of India. It has become a tourist place surrounded by a beautiful gardens.

Education
There are a number of secondary schools and colleges in Choudwar:

Secondary schools 
The following is a list of schools affiliated with the Board of Secondary Education.
 Agrahat High school, Agrahat, Choudwar
 Charbatia UGME and High School.
 Gopabandhu High School.
 Jhoteswar High School, Mundamal (Ward 6).
 Kalinga Public High School.
 Kalinga Vidyapitha
 Municipal Govt High School, Choudwar
 Nigamananda Bidyapitha, named after Swami Nigamananda.
 Nigamananda Girls high School, Daulatabad.
 Odisha Textile Mills High School
 Saraswati Shishu Vidya Mandir, Gandhi Chhak, Choudwar
 Saraswati Shishu Vidya Mandir, Sarada Nagara, Choudwar
 Kendriya Vidyalaya, Charbatia

Colleges 
 Choudwar College, in affiliation with Utkal University offers three year undergraduate courses in sciences, arts, and commerce in accordance with the Council of Higher Secondary Education (CHSE). It is a co-educational institution.
 Choudwar Women's College is  offering senior secondary education.
 Industrial Training Institute, ITT Technical Institute campus and Mechanical Trade of the Government of India offer apprenticeship curriculum.

Industries
 Indian Metals & Ferro Alloys Limited (IMFA)
 Libra Carpets was functional until 1990s, after which it turned uneconomical and defunct.
 Odisha Textile Mills (OTM), a state owned fabric and textiles entity, was operational for more than three decades before it shut down over legal struggles 
 The Thapar paper mill (TPM) began paper and newsprint production in late 1980s until taken over by Ballarpur Industries and shutdown in 2003.

Demographics
According to the 2011 Census of India, Choudwar had a population of 42,597, of which 54% were males and 46% were females. It has an average literacy rate of 77%. The literacy rate for men was 83%, while for women it stood at 71%. 10% of the population was under 6 years old.

Socio-economic conditions
The population of the town works predominantly in the private agencies. A downturn in employment was observed by the shutting down of OTM and BILT paper mills. A small segment of the population comprises teachers, local administration staff, doctors and government employees at the Charbatia Air Base.

Transportation
Choudwar is well-connected due to presence of national highway, which connects Bhubaneswar, Sambalpur and Anugul. Nearest railway station is at 15 km distance in Cuttack. Bhubaneswar railway station in the capital is 42 km away. The town is also serviced via two smaller railway stations at Charbatia and Manguli. The nearest accessible airport is the Biju Patnaik International airport at 55 km distance. The Indian Air force operate a transport and surveillance airfield, exclusive to government use at ARC Charbatia.

Politics
The current MLA from the Choudwar-Cuttack assembly constituency is Souvic Biswal of Biju Janata Dal. Previous MLAs from this seat were Dharmananda Behera (Biju Janata Dal, 2004), Bibhubhusan Praharaj (Independent, 2000), Raj Kishore Ram (Janata Dal, 1977 and 1990) and Kanhu Charan Lenka (Indian National Congress, 1980s & 1995) and Rasananda Sahu (Indian National Congress, 1980s & 1995). Choudwar is part of Cuttack (Lok Sabha constituency).

References

External links
 IMFA group for more information regarding IMFA and ICCL
 Utkal University

Cities and towns in Cuttack district
Cuttack district